The Musgrave Pistol was a South African semi-automatic pistol with a layout and operation based on the Austro-Hungarian Roth-Steyr M1907 automatic pistols. Designed for simplicity and minimal parts number, it failed to find commercial acceptance.

References

9mm Parabellum semi-automatic pistols
Semi-automatic pistols of South Africa